The Bainbridge Island Review is a Friday newspaper in Bainbridge Island in the U.S. state of Washington.  The Review is primarily focused on Bainbridge Island and its communities; the island population is 22,000.

Ownership history 
The Review was owned by Walter Woodward, along with the North Kitsap News, from about 1940 to 1962, when former Albany Democrat-Herald editor David Averill purchased them both. Woodward was to remain as editor of the Review; the News was to be discontinued. Verda Averill sold the Herald and the Review, as well as the Kitsap Advertiser, to the Black Press in 1988; at the time, Black owned seven U.S. papers and 24 Canadian papers.

The Woodwards and Japanese internment
In 1942, Bainbridge islanders of Japanese ancestry were the first in the United States to be relocated to internment camps. The Review was the only English-language newspaper on the West Coast to openly criticize President Franklin D. Roosevelt's Executive Order 9066. Milly and Walt Woodward, the owners and editors of the Review, since about 1940, continued advocating for members of the community who were interned, and hired several as correspondents. These correspondents reported on camp events for publication in the Review.  

A Bainbridge Island school, Woodward Middle School is named in honor of Milly Woodward.

References

External links
Bainbridge Island Review
 Kitsap History, Bainbridge Review, 1941-1946 

Bainbridge Island, Washington
Review
Black Press